The Last White Dishwasher is a 2008 mockumentary short film, based on an original concept by Carlos Alazraqui, and written and directed by Claudia Duran.  It tells the story of the "last white dishwasher in America." It was featured at the Los Angeles Latino International Film Festival on October 14, 2009.

Plot
Bobby Ray Jacobs (Carlos Alazraqui), a Southern man, is the sole remaining Caucasian dishwasher in America, and is surprisingly famous for it. The dishwasher career is a legacy for his family, starting with his grandfather. The film depicts several interviews with Bobby Ray and many of his friends, including his agent Rudy Valentine (Lombardo Boyer) and his British girlfriend Tamara Swanson (Tara Strong), explaining how he got his job and how he got to be where he is today.

Cast
 Carlos Alazraqui as Bobby Ray Jacobs, the title character. He is the last white dishwasher in America.
 Lombardo Boyar as Rudy Valentine, Bobby Ray's agent, and the restaurant manager.
 Tara Strong as Tamara Swanson, Bobby's girlfriend from London.
 Jill Michele Melean as Maria Melendez-Smith, a television reporter.
 Cedric Yarbrough as himself. During his red carpet arrival, he shares a story about Bobby Ray, and supports more white dishwashers.
 Sean Corvelle as Mr. Williams, the line cook. He does not see what the big deal is about Bobby Ray.
 Johnny Sanchez as Yuri, a busboy. He says he wants Bobby Ray to wash the dishes for his daughter's quinceañera.
 Sabastian Centina as Jorge, a busboy. He is upset that Yuri did not choose him.
 Lauren Santos as Audrey, the waitress. She admires Bobby.
 Alexander Bedria as Dr. Skip Singer, Bobby Ray's sports psychologist.
 Cha-Cha as Bambi the dog, Tamara's dog.

References

External links
 
 

2008 films
American mockumentary films
2008 comedy films
2000s English-language films
2000s American films